Underfunded is a comedy-drama made-for-TV movie that aired the United States cable television channel USA Network on November 8, 2006 at 10 PM EDT.

It stars Mather Zickel as Darryl Freehorn, an agent in the Canadian Secret Service (CSS).

Plot
Caught between a constricting budget and an inane American Intelligence Community, Canadian Secret Service agent Darryl Freehorn works as a liaison with the U.S. State Department to solve international conspiracies and busts American prescription drug smugglers. Freehorn is frequently met with skepticism by American officials when he introduces himself as an agent of the CSS, to which he always responds with "We have one, too." Costar Joanna Canton plays Naomi Lutz, a smitten assistant to Freehorn bucking for a job as a full-blown agent. Occasionally over-enthusiastic and she cites her knowledge of the West Wing on NBC as her qualification for a trip to Washington, D.C.

See also
 InSecurity

References

External links
 USA Network: Underfunded

 Canuck spy agency 'Underfunded' Ottawa Sun
 CSIS goes to Hollywood Maclean's
 Underfunded, eh? Vancouver Sun

USA Network original programming
2000s American comedy-drama television series
Films directed by John Fortenberry
2000s spy comedy films
American television films
2006 films
2006 comedy films
2000s English-language films